The Margherita Hut (Italian: Capanna Regina Margherita) is a mountain hut belonging to the Italian Alpine Club, located on the summit of Punta Gnifetti (ital., in German Signalkuppe) of Monte Rosa, a mountain massif of the Alps lying near the border between Italy and Switzerland. It was originally opened in 1893 as a research station for high altitude medicine which it still is, but also serves as a simply equipped mountain hut for alpinists.

Location 
It is also among the largest huts of the massif, together with the Monte Rosa Hut and Gnifetti Hut. The Margherita Hut is located in Italian territory , near the international border between Italy and Switzerland, in the Italian region of Piedmont. The nearest settlement is Alagna Valsesia, in Piedmont, starting point for the traditional climb to the hut.

History
The construction of the hut was directed by the Italian Alpine Club in 1889. The hut was pre-built in the valley, then brought to its final destination by mule and then by men, and assembled on site. It was opened on 18 August 1893, in the presence of Margherita of Savoy, Queen of Italy, to whom the hut is dedicated.

The hut soon became an important research centre for high-elevation medicine, under the direction of Angelo Mosso.

In 1899 a meteorological station was added. The lowest temperature registered was -41°C in the winter of 1928–1929; in recent years the lowest was -37,5°C registered on January the 25th 2005. 

A complete restoration started in 1977. The original hut was dismantled and was replaced by the current hut, built in Valsesia in the town of Failungo Superiore, very close to Alagna Valsesia, which opened in 1980.

Features
The hut is owned by the central committee of the Italian Alpine Club (CAI), but it is managed by the local CAI section of Varallo Sesia.

The hut is open in the summer, from early June to early September, the exact dates varying from year to year. It provides recuperation and accommodation, having 70 beds. In winter, there is an unmanaged winter facility with 12 beds.

From summer 2017, the performance of civil marriage ceremonies within the Margherita Hut was authorised by the mayor of the nearest town, Alagna Valsesia. However, couples wishing to get married will be unable to arrive by helicopter, and will still have to make the long glacier hike via one of the normal mountaineering routes.

Access

The hut can only be accessed on foot. The traditional approach starts from Alagna Valsesia, the town where was organized the first ascent to the summit in 1842 realized by the parish priest of Alagna Valsesia, Giovanni Gnifetti. The walk to the hut usually takes two days; climbers spend a night at the Gnifetti Hut, the Monte Rosa Hut or the Resegotti Hut (from the last one the climb is very difficult and technical since it requires to climb the Signal ridge), from where they set off for the Margherita Hut on the following morning. The walk requires physical fitness and a good knowledge of alpine techniques.

References
Swisstopo topographic and cadastral maps

External links

Official website
Capanna Margherita on "Rifugi Monte Rosa"
Margherita Hut on Hikr
Webcam

Mountain huts in Piedmont
Italy–Switzerland border
Monte Rosa
Mountain huts in the Alps
Mountain huts of Club Alpino Italiano
Alagna Valsesia